East Townsend is an unincorporated community in Huron County, Ohio, United States. It is located in Townsend Township and is part of the Collins census-designated place.

History
The first post office in East Townsend was established in 1833 or 1834. The name of the post office was prefaced with East in order to avoid confusion with Townsend Township, Sandusky County, Ohio.

References

Populated places in Huron County, Ohio